Nasovče (in older sources also Nasoviče) is a small village west of Komenda in the Upper Carniola region of Slovenia.

References

External links

Nasovče on Geopedia

Populated places in the Municipality of Komenda